Horodok urban territorial hromada is a hromada (municipality) in Ukraine, in Lviv Raion of Lviv Oblast. The administrative center is the city of Horodok.

Until 18 July 2020, the hromada belonged to Horodok Raion. The raion was abolished in July 2020 as part of the administrative reform of Ukraine, which reduced the number of raions of Lviv Oblast to seven. The area of Horodok Raion was merged into Lviv Raion.

Settlements 
The hromada consists of 1 city (Horodok) and 38 villages:
 Artyshchiv
 Bar
 Bartativ
 Bratkovychi
 Velyka Kalynka
 Vovchukhy
 Volya-Bartativska
 Halychany
 Hodvyshnya
 Hradivka
 Dobryany
 Dolynyany
 Drozdovychi
 Dubanevychi
 Zavereshytsa
 Zaluzhya
 Zelenyi Hai
 Zushytsi
 Kernytsia
 Lisnovychi
 Lyubovychi
 Mavkovychi
 Mylchytsi
 Myliatyn
 Moloshky
 Mshana
 Pidmohylka
 Poberezhne
 Povitno
 Putyatychi
 Rechychany
 Rodatychi
 Stodilky
 Tuchapy
 Uhry
 Cherlyany
 Cherlyanske Peredmistya
 Sholomynychi

References

External links 
 

Lviv Raion
Hromadas of Lviv Oblast
2020 establishments in Ukraine